Wudadihou was a chanyu of the Xiongnu Empire. The son and successor of Huduershidaogao, he reigned for a few months in 46 AD before dying. He was succeeded by his brother Punu.

Footnotes

References

Bichurin N.Ya., "Collection of information on peoples in Central Asia in ancient times", vol. 1, Sankt Petersburg, 1851, reprint Moscow-Leningrad, 1950

Taskin B.S., "Materials on Sünnu history", Science, Moscow, 1968, p. 31 (In Russian)

Chanyus
1st-century monarchs in Asia

46 deaths